Falling off the Lavender Bridge is the debut album by British artist Lightspeed Champion, which was released on 21 January 2008. The album features the singles "Galaxy of the Lost", "Midnight Surprise" and "Tell Me What It's Worth".

Recording
Devonté Hynes, the main musician in Lightspeed Champion, flew to Omaha, Nebraska in early 2007 to flesh out the songs that he'd written with Mike Mogis, resident producer for Saddle Creek records and a member of Bright Eyes. He stayed there for several months in a guest house decorated by Mogis and Conor Oberst. An assortment of musicians came around to hang out and ended up playing on the record including Mogis himself, trumpet player and pianist Nate Walcott, The Faint's drummer Clark Baechle and guest vocalist Emmy the Great—along with moonlighting members of Cursive and Tilly and the Wall.

According to Hynes, the album is in two-halves; a mixture of his dreams and life experiences. The lavender in the album title refers to a toy frog (made from lavender) Hynes' mother gave to him as a child to help him sleep.

Track listing

Notes
Hynes claims "I Could Have Done This Myself" is "about losing [his] virginity" going on to state, "which is why it's called I Could Have Done This Myself. I later realised that it was actually referring to the second time I had sex; the first time was so traumatic I'd just blanked it out of my memory."

"Dry Lips" describes the last time Hynes - who has to lead a relatively sober life because of stomach ulcers - had a hangover.

The 'Wendela' mentioned in the name of the final track ("No Surprise (For Wendela)") is a reference to Hynes' mother.

Personnel
Devonté Hynes - vocals, guitar
Emmy the Great - additional vocals (tracks 1, 2, 3, 9, 10, 11, 12)
Tim Kasher - additional vocals (track 3)
Derek Pressnall, Kianna Alarid, Susan Sanchez, David Coyote Bones, Nik Fackler, Joe Knapp - group vocals (tracks 7, 12)
Clark Baechle - drums
Kimberley Salistean, Cynthia Ricker, Donna Carnes and Tracy Sands - strings
Nate Walcott - strings arrangement
Tom Clarke - cello
Miguel Picanco - oboe
Mark Benson - clarinet
Karen Murphy - flute
Mike Mogis - producer, mixer, engineer

Charts

References

External links
 Dev Hynes talking in extensive detail about the album
 Lightspeed Champion official website 
 Lightspeed Champion Domino Records artists page
 Lightspeed Champion Album Review on Audiojunkies

2008 debut albums
Dev Hynes albums
Domino Recording Company albums
Albums produced by Mike Mogis